The paradox of tolerance states that if a society is tolerant without limit, its ability to be tolerant is eventually seized or destroyed by the intolerant. Karl Popper described it as the seemingly self-contradictory idea that in order to maintain a tolerant society, the society must retain the right to be intolerant of intolerance.

Discussions
In 1945, philosopher Karl Popper attributed the paradox to Plato's defense of "benevolent despotism" and defined it in The Open Society and Its Enemies.

The term "paradox of tolerance" does not appear anywhere in the main text of The Open Society and Its Enemies. Rather, Popper lists the above as a note to chapter 7, among the mentioned paradoxes proposed by Plato in his apologia for "benevolent despotism"—i.e., true tolerance would inevitably lead to intolerance, so autocratic rule of an enlightened "philosopher-king" would be preferable to leaving the question of tolerance up to majority rule. In the context of chapter 7 of Popper's work, specifically, section II, the note on the paradox of tolerance is intended as further explanation of Popper's rebuttal specific to the paradox as a rationale for autocracy: why political institutions within liberal democracies are preferable to Plato's vision of despotism, and through such institutions, the paradox can be avoided.  The chapter in question explicitly defines the context to that of political institutions and the democratic process, and rejects the notion of "the will of the people" having valid meaning outside of those institutions. Thus, in context, Popper's acquiescence to suppression when all else has failed applies only to the state in a liberal democracy with a constitutional rule of law that must be just in its foundations, but will necessarily be imperfect.

Thomas Jefferson had already addressed the notion of a tolerant society in his first inaugural speech, concerning those who might destabilize the United States and its unity, saying, "let them stand undisturbed as monuments of the safety with which error of opinion may be tolerated where reason is left free to combat it."

In 1971, philosopher John Rawls concluded in A Theory of Justice that a just society must tolerate the intolerant, for otherwise, the society would then itself be intolerant, and thus unjust. However, Rawls qualifies this with the assertion that under extraordinary circumstances in which constitutional safeguards do not suffice to ensure the security of the tolerant and the institutions of liberty, tolerant society has a reasonable right of self-preservation against acts of intolerance that would limit the liberty of others under a just constitution, and this supersedes the principle of tolerance. This should be done, however, only to preserve equal liberty i.e., the liberties of the intolerant should be limited only insofar as they demonstrably limit the liberties of others: "While an intolerant sect does not itself have title to complain of intolerance, its freedom should be restricted only when the tolerant sincerely and with reason believe that their own security and that of the institutions of liberty are in danger."

In On Toleration (1997), Michael Walzer asked, "Should we tolerate the intolerant?" He claims that most minority religious groups who are the beneficiaries of tolerance are themselves intolerant, at least in some respects. In a tolerant regime, such (intolerant) people may learn to tolerate, or at least to behave "as if they possessed this virtue".

Tolerance and freedom of speech
The paradox of tolerance is important in the discussion of what, if any, boundaries are to be set on freedom of speech. Raphael Cohen-Almagor, in the chapter "Popper's Paradox of Tolerance and Its Modification" of The Boundaries of Liberty and Tolerance: The Struggle Against Kahanism in Israel (1994), departs from Popper's limitation to imminent threat of physical harm to extend the argument for censorship to psychological harm, and asserts that to allow freedom of speech to those who would use it to eliminate the very principle upon which that freedom relies is paradoxical. Michel Rosenfeld, in the Harvard Law Review in 1987, stated: "it seems contradictory to extend freedom of speech to extremists who ... if successful, ruthlessly suppress the speech of those with whom they disagree." Rosenfeld points out that Western European democracies and the US have opposite approaches to the question of tolerance of hate speech, in that where most Western European nations place legal penalties on the circulation of extremely intolerant or fringe political materials (e.g. Holocaust denial) as being inherently socially disruptive or inciting of violence, the US has ruled that such materials are in and of themselves protected by the principle of freedom of speech and thus immune to restriction, except when calls to violence or other illegal activities are explicitly and directly made.

Homophily and intolerance
The relation between homophily (a preference for interacting with those with similar traits) and intolerance is manifested when a tolerant person is faced with choosing between either a positive relationship with a tolerant individual of a dissimilar out-group, or a positive relationship with an intolerant in-group member. In the first case, the out-group relationship is disapproved of by the intolerant in-group member. In the second case, the negative relationship toward the out-group individual is endorsed by the intolerant in-group member. Thus, tolerant group members face being ostracized for their toleration by intolerant members of their in-group, or, in the alternative, being rewarded for demonstrating their out-group intolerance to intolerant members of their in-group.

This dilemma has been considered by Fernando Aguiar and Antonio Parravano in Tolerating the Intolerant: Homophily, Intolerance, and Segregation in Social Balanced Networks, modeling a community of individuals whose relationships are governed by a modified form of the Heider balance theory.

See also
 A Critique of Pure Tolerance
 Communist Party of Germany v. the Federal Republic of Germany
 Streitbare Demokratie
 Voluntary slavery

References

External links

Decision-making paradoxes
1945 introductions
Freedom of expression
Karl Popper
Anti-fascism